Burnmoor Tarn, on Eskdale Fell in Cumbria, England, is one of the largest entirely natural tarns in the Lake District. Its waters flow into Whillan Beck at the tarn's north-eastern corner, which immediately turns south and flows into Eskdale, joining the Esk at Beckfoot. Burnmoor Lodge, a former fishing lodge, stands by the southern shore and a mediaeval corpse road runs past the eastern shore where it fords the beck. Eskdale Moor or Boat How lies to the south of the tarn.

The tarn is one of the sites in DEFRA's UK Upland Waters Monitoring Network. There are four main inflow streams to the north and north-west. The outflow at the eastern end joins the Hardrigg Beck which drains the slopes of Scafell and, in times of especially high flow, is partly diverted into the lake across a braided delta.

References 

Lakes of the Lake District
Borough of Copeland